Richard St John Francis Harris (1 October 1930 – 25 October 2002) was an Irish actor and singer. Having studied at the London Academy of Music and Dramatic Art he rose to prominence as an icon of the British New Wave. He's received numerous accolades including the Cannes Film Festival Award for Best Actor, and a Grammy Award. In 2020, he was listed at number 3 on The Irish Timess list of Ireland's greatest film actors.

He received two Academy Award for Best Actor nominations for his performances in This Sporting Life (1963), and The Field (1991). Other notables roles include in The Guns of Navarone (1961), Red Desert (1964), A Man Called Horse (1970), Cromwell (1970), Unforgiven (1992), Gladiator (2000), and The Count of Monte Cristo (2002). He gained acclaim for his role as Albus Dumbledore in the first two Harry Potter films: Harry Potter and the Philosopher's Stone (2001) and Harry Potter and the Chamber of Secrets (2002), the latter of which was his final film role. 

He portrayed King Arthur in the 1967 film Camelot for which he received the Golden Globe Award for Best Actor – Motion Picture Musical or Comedy. He reprised the role in the 1981 Broadway musical revival. He received a Laurence Olivier Award for Best Actor for his role in Henry IV (1991). 

Harris received a Primetime Emmy Award for Outstanding Lead Actor in a Limited Series or Movie nomination for his role in The Snow Goose (1971). Harris had a number-one singing hit in Australia, Jamaica and Canada, and a top-ten hit in the United Kingdom, Ireland, and the United States with his 1968 recording of Jimmy Webb's song "MacArthur Park". He earned a Grammy Award for Best Male Pop Vocal Performance for the song.

Early life 
Harris was born on 1 October 1930, at Overdale, 8 Landsdown Villas, Ennis Road, Limerick, son of flour merchant Ivan Harris and Mildred (née Harty). Overdale was "a tall, elegant, early 19th-century redbrick" house with nine bedrooms, in a wealthy part of Limerick, the houses "built at the turn of the 20th century for Limerick's burgeoning middle class... people who could afford properly grand drawing rooms, a bedroom each for the children and one for the pot, plus space for a few servants". He was educated by the Jesuits at Crescent College. A talented rugby player, he appeared on several Munster Junior and Senior Cup teams for Crescent, and played for Garryowen. Harris's athletic career was cut short when he caught tuberculosis in his teens. He remained an ardent fan of the Munster Rugby and Young Munster teams until his death, attending many of their matches, and there are numerous stories of japes at rugby matches with actors and fellow rugby fans Peter O'Toole and Richard Burton.

After recovering from tuberculosis, Harris moved to Great Britain, wanting to become a director. He could not find any suitable training courses, and enrolled in the London Academy of Music and Dramatic Art to learn acting. He had failed an audition at the Royal Academy of Dramatic Art and had been rejected by the Central School of Speech and Drama, because they felt he was too old at 24. While still a student, he rented the tiny "off-West End" Irving Theatre, and there directed his own production of Clifford Odets's play Winter Journey (The Country Girl).

After completing his studies at the academy, he joined Joan Littlewood's Theatre Workshop. He began getting roles in West End theatre productions, starting with The Quare Fellow in 1956, a transfer from the Theatre Workshop. He spent nearly a decade in obscurity, learning his profession on stages throughout the UK.

Career

1959-1963: Early roles and breakthrough 

Harris made his film debut in 1959 in the film Alive and Kicking, and played the lead role in The Ginger Man in the West End in 1959. In his second film he had a small role as an IRA Volunteer in Shake Hands with the Devil (1959), supporting James Cagney. The film was shot in Ireland and directed by Michael Anderson who offered Harris a role in his next movie, The Wreck of the Mary Deare (1959), shot in Hollywood.

Harris played another IRA Volunteer in A Terrible Beauty (1960), alongside Robert Mitchum. He had a memorable bit part in the film The Guns of Navarone (1961) as a Royal Australian Air Force pilot who reports that blowing up the "bloody guns" of the island of Navarone is impossible by an air raid. He had a larger part in The Long and the Short and the Tall (1961), playing a British soldier; Harris clashed with Laurence Harvey and Richard Todd during filming. For his role in the film Mutiny on the Bounty (1962), despite being virtually unknown to film audiences, Harris reportedly insisted on third billing, behind Trevor Howard and Marlon Brando, an actor he greatly admired. However, Harris fell out with Brando over the latter's behaviour during the film's production.

Harris's first starring role was in the film This Sporting Life (1963), as a bitter young coal miner, Frank Machin, who becomes an acclaimed rugby league football player. It was based on the novel by David Storey and directed by Lindsay Anderson. For his role, Harris won Best Actor in 1963 at the Cannes Film Festival and an Academy Award nomination. Harris followed this with a leading role in the Italian film, Michelangelo Antonioni's Il Deserto Rosso (Red Desert, 1964). This won the Golden Lion at the Venice Film Festival.

Harris received an offer to support Kirk Douglas in a British war film, The Heroes of Telemark (1965), directed by Anthony Mann, playing a Norwegian resistance leader. He then went to Hollywood to support Charlton Heston in Sam Peckinpah's Major Dundee (1965), as an Irish immigrant who became a Confederate cavalryman during the American Civil War. He played Cain in John Huston's film The Bible: In the Beginning... (1966). More successful at the box office was Hawaii (1966), in which Harris starred alongside Julie Andrews and Max von Sydow.

1967-1971: Rise to prominence 
As a change of pace, he was the romantic lead in a Doris Day spy spoof comedy, Caprice (1967), directed by Frank Tashlin. Harris next performed the role of King Arthur in the film adaptation of the musical play Camelot (1967). Critic Roger Ebert described the casting of Harris and Vanessa Redgrave as "about the best King Arthur and Queen Guenevere I can imagine". Harris revived the role in a Broadway revival at the Winter Garden Theatre from 15 November 1981, to 2 January 1982, and broadcast on HBO a year later. Starring Meg Bussert as Guenevere, Richard Muenz as Lancelot and Thor Fields as Tom of Warwick. Harris, who had starred in the film, and Muenz also took the show on tour nationwide.

In The Molly Maguires (1970), he played James McParland, the detective who infiltrates the title organisation, headed by Sean Connery. It was a box office flop. However A Man Called Horse (1970), with Harris in the title role, an 1825 English aristocrat who is captured by Native Americans, was a major success. He played the title role in the film Cromwell in 1970 opposite Alec Guinness as King Charles I of England. That year British exhibitors voted him the 9th-most popular star at the UK box office.

In 1971 Harris starred in a BBC TV film adaptation The Snow Goose, from a screenplay by Paul Gallico. It won a Golden Globe for Best Movie made for TV and was nominated for both a BAFTA and an Emmy. and was shown in the U.S. as part of the Hallmark Hall of Fame. He made his directorial debut with Bloomfield (1971) and starred in Man in the Wilderness (1971), a revisionist Western based on the Hugh Glass story.

1973-1981: Established actor 

Harris starred in a Western for Samuel Fuller, Riata, which stopped production several weeks into filming. The project was re-assembled with a new director and cast, except for Harris, who returned: The Deadly Trackers (1973). In 1973, Harris published a book of poetry, I, In the Membership of My Days, which was later reissued in part in an audio LP format, augmented by self-penned songs such as "I Don't Know".

Harris starred in two thrillers: 99 and 44/100% Dead (1974), for John Frankenheimer, and Juggernaut (1974), for Richard Lester. In Echoes of a Summer (1976) he played the father of a young girl with a terminal illness. He had a cameo as Richard the Lionheart in Robin and Marian (1976), for Lester, then was in The Return of a Man Called Horse (1976). Harris led the all-star cast in the train disaster film The Cassandra Crossing (1976). He played Gulliver in the part-animated Gulliver's Travels (1977) and was reunited with Michael Anderson in Orca (1977), battling a killer whale.

He appeared in another action film, Golden Rendezvous (1977), based on a novel by Alistair Maclean, shot in South Africa. Harris was sued by the film's producer for his drinking; Harris counter-sued for defamation and the matter was settled out of court. Golden Rendezvous was a flop but The Wild Geese (1978), where Harris played one of several mercenaries, was a big success outside America. Ravagers (1979) was more action, set in a post-apocalyptic world. Game for Vultures (1979) was set in Rhodesia and shot in South Africa. 

In Hollywood he appeared in a comedy, The Last Word (1979), then supported Bo Derek in Tarzan, the Ape Man (1981). He made a film in Canada, Your Ticket Is No Longer Valid (1981), a drama about impotence. He followed it with another Canadian film, Highpoint, a movie so bad it was not released for several years.

1980-1988: Continued success 
For a while in the 1980s, Harris went into semi-retirement on Paradise Island, in the Bahamas, where he kicked his drinking habit and embraced a healthier lifestyle. It had a beneficial effect. Harris's career was revived by his success on stage in Camelot, and powerful performance in the West End run of Pirandello's Henry IV.

He was the subject of This Is Your Life in 1990, when he was surprised by Michael Aspel during the curtain call of the Pirandello's play Henry IV at the Wyndham's Theatre in London.
Over several years in the late 1980s, Harris worked with Irish author Michael Feeney Callan on his biography, which was published by Sidgwick & Jackson in 1990. His film work during this period included: Triumphs of a Man Called Horse (1983), Martin's Day (1985), Strike Commando 2 (1988), King of the Wind (1990) and Mack the Knife (1990) (a film version of The Threepenny Opera in which he played J.J. Peachum ) plus the TV film version of Maigret, opposite Barbara Shelley. This indicated declining popularity which Harris told his biographer, Michael Feeney Callan, he was "utterly reconciled to".

1989-2002: Stardom and final roles 

In June 1989, director Jim Sheridan cast Harris in the lead role in The Field, written by the esteemed Irish playwright John B. Keane. The lead role of "Bull" McCabe was to be played by former Abbey Theatre actor Ray McAnally. When McAnally died suddenly on 15 June 1989, Harris was offered the McCabe role. The Field was released in 1990 and earned Harris his second Academy Award nomination for Best Actor. He lost to Jeremy Irons for Reversal of Fortune. In 1992, Harris had a supporting role in the film Patriot Games. He had good roles in Unforgiven (1992), Wrestling Ernest Hemingway (1993) and Silent Tongue (1994). He played the title role in Abraham (1994) and had the lead in Cry, the Beloved Country (1995).

A lifelong supporter of Jesuit education principles, Harris established a friendship with University of Scranton President Rev. J. A. Panuska and raised funds for a scholarship for Irish students established in honour of his brother and manager, Dermot, who had died the previous year of a heart attack. He chaired acting workshops and cast the university's production of Julius Caesar in November 1987.

Harris appeared in two films which won the Academy Award for Best Picture: firstly as the gunfighter "English Bob" in the revisionist Western Unforgiven (1992); secondly as the Roman Emperor Marcus Aurelius in Ridley Scott's Gladiator (2000). He also played a lead role alongside James Earl Jones in the Darrell Roodt film adaptation of Cry, the Beloved Country (1995). In 1999, Harris starred in the film To Walk with Lions. After Gladiator, Harris played the supporting role of Albus Dumbledore in the first two of the Harry Potter films, Harry Potter and the Philosopher’s Stone (2001) and Harry Potter and the Chamber of Secrets (2002), the latter of which was his final film role. Harris portrayed Abbé Faria in Kevin Reynolds' film adaptation of The Count of Monte Cristo (2002). The film Kaena: The Prophecy (2003) was dedicated to him posthumously as he had voiced the character Opaz before his death.

Harris hesitated to take the role of Dumbledore in Harry Potter and the Philosopher's Stone (2001) at first due to his declining health, but ultimately accepted because his 11-year-old granddaughter threatened never to speak to him again if he did not take it. In an interview with the Toronto Star in 2001, Harris expressed his concern that his association with the Harry Potter films would outshine the rest of his career. He explained, "Because, you see, I don't just want to be remembered for being in those bloody films, and I'm afraid that's what's going to happen to me."

Harris also made part of the Bible TV movie project filmed as a cinema production for the TV, a project produced by Lux Vide Italy with the collaboration of Radio Televisione Italiana RAI and Channel 5 of France, and premiered in the United States in the channel TNT in the 1990s. He portrayed the main and title character in the production Abraham (1993) as well as Saint John of Patmos in the 2000 TV film production Apocalypse.

Singing career 
Harris recorded several albums of music, one of which, A Tramp Shining, included the seven-minute hit song "MacArthur Park" (Harris insisted on singing the lyric as "MacArthur's Park"). This song was written by Jimmy Webb, and it reached number 2 on the American Billboard Hot 100 chart. It also topped several music sales charts in Europe during the summer of 1968. "MacArthur Park" sold over one million copies and was awarded a gold disc. A second album, also consisting entirely of music composed by Webb, The Yard Went on Forever, was released in 1969. In the 1973 TV special "Burt Bacharach in Shangri-La", after singing Webb's "Didn't We", Harris tells Bacharach that since he was not a trained singer he approached songs as an actor concerned with words and emotions, acting the song with the sort of honesty the song is trying to convey. Then he proceeds to sing "If I Could Go Back", from the Lost Horizon soundtrack.

Personal life 

In 1957, Harris married Elizabeth Rees-Williams, daughter of David Rees-Williams, 1st Baron Ogmore. They had three children: actor Jared Harris, actor Jamie Harris, and director Damian Harris. Harris and Rees-Williams divorced in 1969, after which Elizabeth married Rex Harrison. Harris's second marriage was to the American actress Ann Turkel. In 1982, they divorced.

Harris was a member of the Roman Catholic Knights of Malta, and was also dubbed a knight by the Queen of Denmark in 1985.

Harris paid £75,000 for William Burges' Tower House in Holland Park in 1968, after discovering that the American entertainer Liberace had arranged to buy the house but had not yet put down a deposit. Harris employed the original decorators, Campbell Smith & Company Ltd., to carry out extensive restoration work on the interior.

Harris was a vocal supporter of the Provisional Irish Republican Army (PIRA) from 1973 until 1984. In January 1984 remarks he made on the previous month's Harrods bombing caused great controversy, after which he discontinued his support for the PIRA.

At the height of his stardom in the 1960s and early 1970s Harris was almost as well known for his hellraiser lifestyle and heavy drinking as he was for his acting career. He was a longtime alcoholic until he became a teetotaller in 1981. Nevertheless, he did resume drinking Guinness a decade later. He gave up drugs after almost dying from a cocaine overdose in 1978.

Illness and death 
Harris was diagnosed with Hodgkin's disease in August 2002, reportedly after being hospitalised with pneumonia. He died at University College Hospital in Bloomsbury, London, on 25 October 2002, aged 72. Harris had quipped that "It was the food!" as he was wheeled out of the Savoy Hotel for the last time. He was survived by his three sons, Damian, Jared and Jamie, having spent his final three days in a coma. Harris's body was cremated, and his ashes were scattered in the Bahamas, where he owned a home.

Harris was a lifelong friend of actor Peter O'Toole, and his family reportedly hoped that O'Toole would replace Harris as Dumbledore in Harry Potter and the Prisoner of Azkaban (2004). There were, however, concerns about insuring O'Toole for the six remaining films in the series. Harris was ultimately succeeded as Dumbledore by Michael Gambon. Chris Columbus, director of Philosopher's Stone and Harry Potter and the Chamber of Secrets (2002), had visited Harris during his last days and had promised him to not recast him as Dumbledore, confident of his eventual recovery. In a 2021 interview with The Hollywood Reporter, Columbus revealed that Harris was writing an autobiography during his stay at the hospital, but the autobiography has never been published.

Memorials and legacy 

On 30 September 2006, Manuel Di Lucia, of Kilkee, County Clare, a longtime friend, organised the placement in Kilkee of a bronze life-size statue of Richard Harris. It shows Harris at the age of eighteen playing the sport of squash. The sculptor was Seamus Connolly and the work was unveiled by Russell Crowe. Harris was an accomplished squash racquets player, winning the Tivoli Cup in Kilkee four years in a row from 1948 to 1951, a record unsurpassed to this day.

Another life-size statue of Richard Harris, as King Arthur from his film Camelot, has been erected in Bedford Row, in the centre of his home town of Limerick. The sculptor of this statue was the Irish sculptor Jim Connolly, a graduate of the Limerick School of Art and Design.

At the 2009 BAFTAs, Mickey Rourke dedicated his Best Actor award to Harris, calling him a "good friend and great actor".

In 2013, Rob Gill and Zeb Moore founded the annual Richard Harris International Film Festival.
The Richard Harris Film Festival is one of Ireland's fastest-growing film festivals, growing from just ten films in 2013 to over 115 films in 2017. Each year, one of Harris's sons attends the festival in Limerick.

In 2015, the Limerick Writers' Centre unveiled a commemorative plaque outside Charlie St George's pub on Parnell Street. The pub was a favourite drinking place of Harris on his visits to Limerick. The plaque, celebrating Harris's literary output as part of a Literary Walking Tour of Limerick, was unveiled by his son Jared Harris.

In 1996, Harris was honoured with a commemorative Irish postage stamp for the "Centenary of Irish Cinema", a four-stamp set featuring twelve Irish actors in four Irish films. He was again honoured in ‘Irish Abroad’ stamps in 2020.

Filmography

Film

Television

Theatre

Awards and nominations

Discography

Albums 

 Camelot (Motion Picture Soundtrack) (1967)
 A Tramp Shining (1968)
 The Yard Went On Forever (1968)
 The Richard Harris Love Album (1970)
 My Boy (1971)
 Slides (1972)
 His Greatest Performances (1973)
 The Prophet (1974) (music by Arif Mardin, based on The Prophet by Kahlil Gibran)
 I, in the Membership of My Days (1974)
 Gulliver Travels (1977)
 Camelot (Original 1982 London Cast recording) (1982)
 Mack The Knife (Original Soundtrack) (1989)
 Little Tramp (1992) Musical
 The Apocalypse (2004) the story of John the Apostle on Island named Patmos

Singles 

 "Here in My Heart" (Theme from This Sporting Life)" (1963)
 "How to Handle a Woman (from Camelot)" (1968)
 "MacArthur Park" (1968)
 "Didn't We?" (1968)
 "The Yard Went On Forever" (1968)
 "The Hive" (1969)
 "One of the Nicer Things" (1969)
 "Fill the World With Love" (1969)
 "Ballad of A Man Called Horse" (1970)
 "Morning of the Mourning for Another Kennedy" (1970)
 "Go to the Mirror" (1971)
 "My Boy" (1971)
 "Turning Back the Pages" (1972)
 "Half of Every Dream" (1972)
 "Trilogy (Love, Marriage, Children)" (1974)
 "The Last Castle (Theme from Echoes of a Summer)" (1976)
 "Lilliput (Theme from Gulliver's Travels)" (1977)

Soundtracks 

 Camelot (Original 1982 London Cast Recording) (1988)
 Mack the Knife (Motion Picture Soundtrack) (1989)
 Tommy (studio recording) (1990)
 Camelot (Motion Picture Soundtrack) (1993)

Compilations 

 A Tramp Shining (1993)
 The Prophet (1995)
 The Webb Sessions 1968–1969 (1996)
 MacArthur Park (1997)
 Slides/My Boy (2-CD Set) (2005)
 My Boy (2006)
 Man of Words Man of Music The Anthology 1968–1974 (2008)

References

Further reading

External links 
 
 
 
 
 Richard Harris file at Limerick City Library, Ireland
 Obituary by Paul Bond at the World Socialist Web Site

1930 births
2002 deaths
20th-century Irish male actors
20th-century Irish male singers
21st-century Irish male actors
Alumni of the London Academy of Music and Dramatic Art
Audiobook narrators
Best Musical or Comedy Actor Golden Globe (film) winners
Cannes Film Festival Award for Best Actor winners
Deaths from cancer in England
Deaths from Hodgkin lymphoma
Dunhill Records artists
European Film Awards winners (people)
Garryowen Football Club players
Grammy Award winners
Irish emigrants to the United Kingdom
Irish film directors
Irish male film actors
Irish male stage actors
Irish rugby union players
Knights of Malta
Male actors from Limerick (city)
People educated at Crescent College
Musicians from Limerick (city)
Racquets players
University of Scranton faculty
Rugby union players from Limerick (city)
Fellows of the American Physical Society